In philosophy and in its current sense, rationalism is a line of thought that appeals to reason or the intellect as a primary or fundamental source of knowledge or justification". It is typically contrasted with empiricism, which appeals to sensory experience as a primary or fundamental source of knowledge or justification. Rationalism should not be confused with rationality, nor with rationalization.

The following is a list of rationalists, that is, people who theorize about rationalism as a line of thought within the area of Philosophy.

Rationalists born BCE
Pythagoras
Plato
Socrates

Rationalists born in the 1st to 4th centuries
Augustine of Hippo
Origen of Alexandria
Plotinus
Wang Chong

Rationalists born in the Middle Ages
Al-Farabi
Al-Ma'arri
Avicenna
Averroes
Maimonides

Rationalists born in the 16th to 19th centuries
René Descartes
Nicolas Malebranche
Baruch Spinoza
Gottfried Leibniz
Christian Wolff

Rationalists born in the 20th century
David Chalmers
Noam Chomsky
Alvin Plantinga
Ernest Sosa
Prabir Ghosh
Periyar E. V. Ramasamy
Hosur Narashimaiah
Abraham Kovoor
Ayn Rand

References

 
Rationalists